String Lake is located in Grand Teton National Park, in the U. S. state of Wyoming. The natural lake is located at the outflow of Leigh Lake. A small wetland area is on the northwest side of the lake and is prime moose habitat. A short half mile (.8 km) long creek connects String Lake to Jenny Lake to the south. The lake can easily be accessed by vehicle and a number of trails commence from the String Lake trailhead parking area.

See also
Geology of the Grand Teton area

References

Lakes of Grand Teton National Park